The stripe-cheeked greenbul (Arizelocichla milanjensis) is a species of the bulbul family of passerine birds. It is found in south-eastern Africa. Its natural habitat is subtropical or tropical moist montane forests.

Taxonomy and systematics
The stripe-cheeked greenbul was originally described in the genus Xenocichla (a synonym for Bleda), then classified in Andropadus and, in 2010 re-classified to the new genus Arizelocichla. Alternatively, some authorities classify the stripe-cheeked greenbul in the genus Pycnonotus. Some authorities consider the olive-headed greenbul and stripe-faced greenbul to be subspecies of the stripe-cheeked greenbul. Alternate names for the stripe-cheeked greenbul include the Mulanji stripe-cheeked greenbul and stripe-cheeked bulbul.

Distribution and habitat
The stripe-cheeked greenbul is found in the highlands of south-eastern Malawi (Mount Mulanje), extreme eastern Zimbabwe and west-central Mozambique.

References

External links
 (Stripe-cheeked greenbul = ) Stripe-cheeked bulbul - Species text in The Atlas of Southern African Birds.

stripe-cheeked greenbul
Birds of East Africa
stripe-cheeked greenbul
stripe-cheeked greenbul
Taxonomy articles created by Polbot